In military tactics, extraction (also exfiltration or exfil) is the process of removing personnel when it is considered imperative that they be immediately relocated out of a hostile environment and taken to an area either occupied or controlled by friendly personnel. Extraction is not always used during hostile environments, but can be used or referred to during training environments as well.

There are primarily two kinds of extraction:
 Friendly: The subject involved is willing and is expected to cooperate with the personnel implementing the operation, when referring to enemy prisoners of war or being taken to captivity.
 Hostile: The subject involved is unwilling and is being transferred by forceful coercion with the possibility/likelihood of engaging enemy personnel in any area either in and/or around the extraction zone.

An example of a hostile extraction was the capture and transportation to Israel for trial of the German Nazi war criminal Adolf Eichmann by Israel's Mossad agents on May 11, 1960. An example of a friendly extraction was the joint U.S. Central Intelligence Agency-Canadian government operation to smuggle six fugitive American diplomatic personnel out of revolutionary Iran in 1980 in an operation later known as the Canadian Caper. Both of these examples have been used as plots for major motion pictures in the US.

In most cases, extraction or exfiltration (exfil) are the most commonly known term used when referring to the leaving of an area. Exfiltration is also used when referring data in a military manner.

See also 

 Infiltration tactics
 Landing zone

Maneuver tactics